The Lyceum of the Philippines University – Laguna (formerly Lyceum Institute of Technology), one of the campuses of the Lyceum of the Philippines University, is an institute of higher education located in Km. 54, Brgy. Makiling, Calamba in the province of Laguna, Philippines. It was founded by Senator Sotero H. Laurel on January 18, 2000 as the third campus of the LPU system after Manila and Batangas.

Currently, Lyceum of the Philippines University has 43 degree, non-degree, masters, and doctorate programs to offer.

Institution 
The university offers undergraduate and graduate programs in various fields, including computer studies, engineering, arts, business, accountancy, tourism, hospitality management and medicine.

Palaestra Consortio 

Palaestra Consortio, which is Latin term for “Training Partner”, is the industry linkage arm of Lyceum. It provides for student on-the-job training and internship programs, job placement programs, and meetings and consultations with industry leaders.

The major industry partners of Lyceum are Yazaki-Torres Manufacturing Inc, a manufacturer of wiring and other automotive parts, and St. Frances Cabrini Medical Center, which led to the formation of LPU-St. Cabrini College of Allied Medicine, a joint effort between LPU-Laguna and St. Cabrini.

Colleges

LPU - St. Cabrini School of Health Sciences
 Bachelor of Science in Medical Laboratory Science
 Bachelor of Science in Radiologic Technology
 Bachelor of Science in Nursing
 Bachelor of Science in Pharmacy
 Doctor of Optometry
 Doctor of Medicine

College of Arts and Sciences

 Bachelor of Arts in Communication 
 Bachelor of Arts in Multimedia Arts
 Bachelor of Science in Psychology
 Bachelor of Science is Biology

College of Business and Accountancy 
Certified Member of Association to Advance Collegiate Schools of Business or AACSB

 Bachelor of Science in Accountancy
 Bachelor of Science in Legal Management
 Bachelor of Science in Business Administration
 BSBA Management Accounting
 BSBA Marketing Management
 BSBA Operations Management
 BSBA Financial Management
 BSBA People Management
 BSBA Business Economics
 Bachelor of Science in Entrepreneurship
 Bachelor of Science in Customs Administration

College of Engineering and Computer Studies

 Bachelor of Science in Civil Engineering
 Bachelor of Science in Computer Engineering
 Bachelor of Science in Electronics Engineering 
 Bachelor of Science in Electrical Engineering
 Bachelor of Science in Industrial Engineering
 Bachelor of Science in Computer Science
 Bachelor of Science in Information Technology
 Bachelor of Science in Computer Science Major in Game Development
 Associate in Computer Technology

College of International Tourism and Hospitality Management 

All programs accredited by The International Centre for Excellence in Tourism and Hospitality Education or THE-ICE

 Bachelor of Science in International Hospitality Management with specialization in:
 Hotel and Restaurant Administration
 Culinary Arts and Kitchen Operations
 Cruise Line Operations in Hotel Services
 Cruise Line Operations in Culinary Arts
 Bachelor of Science in International Travel and Tourism Management
 Associate in International Travel and Tourism Management
 Associate in Hotel and Restaurant Administration
 Associate in Culinary Arts in Kitchen Operations 
 Associate in Hospitality Management

LPU Graduate School 

PhD in Management
Master in Business Administration
Master in Public Administration
MA in English Language Studies
MA in Information Technology Education
MA in Educational Leadership and Management
MA in Psychology
MA in Industrial Engineering
MS in Information Technology

LPU - Laguna International School 

 Grade 7-10 Junior High School
 Grade 11-12 Senior High School

Student Councils and Organizations

University-wide student organizations 

 Lyceum Supreme Student Council
 Lyceum Pirates Dance Troupe
 Lyceum Concert Singers
 Lyceum Theatre Ensemble
 Tatsulok Psychology Organization
 The Voyage
 Lyceum Music Circle
 Peer Facilitator's Society 
 CFC-Youth for Christ LPU-Laguna Chapter
 Lyceum Kalikasan
 Youth in Action
 League of Warriors
 LPU-L General Engineering and Mathematics Society
 Mechatronics and Robotics Society of the Philippines LPU Laguna Chapter
 Junior Association of Business Managers
 Lyceum Filmmakers' Society
 International Students' Association

See also 

 Lyceum of the Philippines University - Batangas
 Lyceum of the Philippines University - Cavite
 José P. Laurel

References 

Lyceum of the Philippines University
Universities and colleges in Laguna (province)
Laurel family
Educational institutions established in 2000
Private schools in the Philippines
Education in Calamba, Laguna
2000 establishments in the Philippines